Jefferson Monroe Levy (April 16, 1852 – March 6, 1924) was a three-term U.S. Congressman from New York, a leader of the New York Democratic Party, and a renowned real estate and stock speculator.

In 1879 at the age of 27, he took control of Monticello, Thomas Jefferson's home.  His late uncle Uriah P. Levy had purchased the property in 1834, several years after Jefferson's death.  Like his uncle, Levy spent a considerable part of his fortune having Monticello and its grounds restored and preserved. In 1923, the property was purchased by the Thomas Jefferson Foundation (then known as the Thomas Jefferson Memorial Foundation), a privately established group formed to purchase and operate Monticello as a memorial. It has since operated the site and mansion as a house museum. The Levy family privately protected the National Historic Landmark for nearly a century because of their regard for Thomas Jefferson and on behalf of the American people.

Early life and education
Born in New York City to Jonas Levy and Frances (Phillips) Levy, an American Jewish couple, Jefferson was one of five children.  His father was a merchant and sea captain, and his mother was a descendant of Jonas Phillips and his wife Rebecca Machado. Levy and his siblings attended public and private schools.  His mother's parents had immigrated from Germany and London in the mid-18th century, respectively, and his father's Sephardic Jewish ancestors, also from London, were among the first settlers of Savannah, Georgia in 1733.

Levy graduated from the New York University Law School in 1873. He was admitted to the bar and practiced in New York City, making money in real estate investment and finance.

Monticello
Jefferson Levy's uncle Uriah P. Levy, the first Jewish commodore (highest rank at the time) of the US Navy, had bought Monticello and some related property in 1834.  He had spent much money to restore and preserve the house and grounds, which he used as a summer retreat. During the American Civil War, the Confederacy took control of the property.  After the war, the lawyers of Levy's estate regained it for his heirs. In 1879, after buying out the other heirs of his uncle Uriah P. Levy for $10,050, Jefferson Levy took control of Monticello (formerly the plantation of Thomas Jefferson).

When Jefferson Levy took over, the grounds had been reduced to 218 acres. During his tenure, he bought 500 acres to add to the complex. The house and grounds were in severe disrepair due to the overseer Joel Wheeler's lack of care and lengthy lawsuits among the heirs after his uncle's death. Levy spent hundreds of thousands of dollars repairing, restoring, and preserving Monticello, work led by Thomas Rhodes, his on-site superintendent. Levy regularly spent four months a year at the estate and became active in Charlottesville.  In 1880 he paid for the restoration of the Town Hall, originally built as a theater, and named it the Levy Opera House. He allowed visitors to see the house, Monticello, sometimes getting as many as 60 per day.

Beginning about 1909, Maud Littleton, the wife of New York Congressman John Littleton, started a campaign to have the U.S. Congress buy the mansion and property, and turn it into a government-run monument to Thomas Jefferson. Part of her campaign was heated. Dismayed by newspaper articles that belittled Jefferson Levy's ownership (Levy was also a Congressman from New York at the time), the Albemarle Chapter of the Daughters of the American Revolution (DAR) in November 1912 unanimously adopted the following resolution:

In 1915, after the Southerner Woodrow Wilson was elected to the presidency, the likelihood of Congressional approval seemed high, but authorization was not achieved.  In the Post–World War I recession, Levy's fortune declined. In 1923 he agreed to a down payment and mortgage for Monticello's sale to the newly organized Thomas Jefferson Foundation, which raised funds for the purchase and operated it as a house museum.

Marriage and family
Jefferson Levy never married; his mother and a sister acted as hostesses during his stays at Monticello.

Levy died in New York City in 1924.  He was interred in Beth Olam Cemetery, associated with the Spanish and Portuguese Synagogue in Brooklyn, near his uncle Uriah Levy.

Political career
Levy was elected as a Democrat to the Fifty-sixth Congress, serving from March 4, 1899, to March 3, 1901. He was not a candidate for renomination in 1900. After this, he resumed law practice in New York City and attended to his real estate and stock investments.

He was later elected to the Sixty-second and Sixty-third Congresses, serving from March 4, 1911, to March 3, 1915. He was not a candidate for renomination in 1914. He resumed the practice of law in New York City.

Other activities
Levy was involved with the American Boy Scouts. He resigned from the board along with William Randolph Hearst over poor fundraising actions in 1910.

In 1894 Levy became a member of the New York State Society of the Sons of the American Revolution.  He was assigned national membership number 4539 and state-society number 439.

Legacy and honors
George Burroughs Torrey painted Levy's portrait.
He restored and preserved Monticello, now designated a National Historic Landmark; and restored Town Hall in Charlottesville.
After 1985, when Dan Jordan became president of the Thomas Jefferson Foundation, he arranged to honor the Levy family - uncle and nephew- at Monticello for their roles in preserving the mansion. Jordan had Rachel Levy's gravesite restored, and the Foundation commissioned a monograph that recognized the contributions of the family and was published in 2001.
In 2001, the Thomas Jefferson Foundation published The Levy Family and Monticello, 1834-1923: Saving Thomas Jefferson's House, a history of Jefferson and Uriah Levy's contributions. That same year, Free Press/Simon & Schuster published Marc Leepson's Saving Monticello: The Levy Family's Epic Quest to Rescue the House that Jefferson Built.

See also
List of Jewish members of the United States Congress

Sources

References

Marc Leepson, Saving Monticello: The Levy family's Epic Quest to Rescue the House That Jefferson Built, Free Press/Simon & Schuster, 2001; University of Virginia Press, (paperback), 2003, access date, March 1, 2020
Urofsky, Melvin I. The Levy Family and Monticello, 1834-1923: Saving Thomas Jefferson's House, Monticello: Thomas Jefferson Foundation, 2001

External links

1852 births
1924 deaths
19th-century American Jews
20th-century American Jews
19th-century American politicians
20th-century American politicians
American people of English-Jewish descent
American people of German-Jewish descent
New York University School of Law alumni
Jewish members of the United States House of Representatives
New York (state) lawyers
Politicians from New York City
American Sephardic Jews
Democratic Party members of the United States House of Representatives from New York (state)
19th-century American lawyers
Monticello
Burials at Beth Olom Cemetery